CCCU is an abbreviation that can refer to:

Council for Christian Colleges and Universities
Canterbury Christ Church University
Churches of Christ in Christian Union
Community College of City University